Curtis Creek is a stream in Cache County, Utah, United States.

Curtis Creek bears the name of Lehi Curtis, a local rancher.

See also
List of rivers of Utah

References

Rivers of Cache County, Utah
Rivers of Utah